Saint-Georges-sur-Fontaine (literally Saint-Georges on Fontaine) is a commune in the Seine-Maritime department in the Normandy region in northern France.

Geography

Population

Places of interest
 The church of St. Georges, with vaulted ceilings dating from the sixteenth century.
 Two manorhouses, at the hamlets of Le Varat and Coquereaumont.
 A seventeenth century chapel.

See also
Communes of the Seine-Maritime department

References

Communes of Seine-Maritime